Rolando Santiago Jácome Ponce, known simply as Santiago Jácome (born April 4, 1973), is a retired Ecuadorian footballer who currently is the sporting director of LDU Quito.

Club career
Jácome spent the majority of his professional career with the Quito-based club, except for one season with Universidad Católica. He retired from football after the 2007 season.

International career
Between 1999 and 2000, he earned three caps with the Ecuador national team.

Honors
LDU Quito
Serie A: 1998, 1999, 2003, 2005 Apertura, 2007
Serie B: 2001

External links
FEF player card 

1973 births
Living people
Footballers from Quito
Association football defenders
Ecuadorian footballers
Ecuador international footballers
L.D.U. Quito footballers
C.D. Universidad Católica del Ecuador footballers